The great antshrike (Taraba major) is a passerine bird in the antbird family, Thamnophilidae. It is the only member of the genus Taraba. It is a resident breeder in the tropical New World in southern Mexico, Central America, Trinidad and South America down to northern Argentina and southeastern Brazil.

Taxonomy
The great antshrike was described by the French ornithologist Louis Vieillot in 1816 and given the binomial name Thamnophilus major. The current genus Taraba was introduced by the French naturalist René Lesson in 1831. There are ten recognised subspecies.

Description
The great antshrike is a large and distinctive antbird, typically 20.3 cm (about 8 inches) long, and weighs 56 g. It has a crest, heavy hooked bill, and brilliant red eyes. The adult male has black upperparts, with two white wingbars and white underparts. There is a white dorsal patch normally concealed except in threat display; young males are similar to the adult, but have rufous wing coverts. The female has rich rufous upperparts and white underparts.

Distribution and habitat
This is a bird of thickets, cocoa and citrus plantations and sometimes gardens, with a preference for dense undergrowth. It is usually found as territorial pairs.

Behaviour
The female lays two, sometimes three, grey-marked white eggs in a deep cup nest in a shrub, which are incubated by both sexes for 14 days to hatching. The chicks fledge in another 12 days.

The great antshrike feeds on insects and other arthropods gleaned from foliage. It will also take small lizards and mammals. It is a skulking species, which may be located by its song, 30 to 40 musical pook-pook-pook notes, or a snarled churrrr.  Sleeping birds are readily located at sites such as the Asa Wright Nature Centre on Trinidad.

References

Further reading

External links 
 Great antshrike videos on the Internet Bird Collection
 Stamps (for Nicaragua) with RangeMap
 Great antshrike photo gallery VIREO (photo close-up of Red Eye)
 Photo-Medium Res; Article ib.usp.br—"Thamnophilidae" Photo-2--High Res

great antshrike
Birds of South America
Birds of the Amazon Basin
Birds of Bolivia
Birds of Brazil
Birds of Colombia
Birds of Ecuador
Birds of the Guianas
Birds of Trinidad and Tobago
Birds of Central America
Birds of Nicaragua
Birds of Paraguay
Birds of Venezuela
great antshrike
great antshrike